Gahmar is a village in India, located near the Ganges river in the Ghazipur district in the state of Uttar Pradesh. The village is 38 km from Ghazipur. The village has 
two post offices, 2 UBI, 1 SBI, 1 HDFC Bank & more than 10 ATM, Public library and one Panchayat Bhawan. This village is known as "Village of Soldiers" and Asia's largest Village

History
Gahmar was settled by Sikarwar Rajputs, the descendants of Dham Deo sikarwar who came from the vicinity of Fatehpur Sikri after Babur captured it in 1527 AD. After moving east from Fatehpur Sikri, initially, both of them settled in Sakradih, but due to floods, Dham Deo migrated to Maa Kamakhya Dham near Gahmar and Kam Deo settled in Reotipur. Dham Dev had two sonsRoop Ram Rao and Diwan Ram Rao. One of Roop Ram's son, Sainu Mal Rao and his descendants settled largely in Gahmar. By 1800 AD, 23 patties in Gahmar were established by the clan members.

Demographics 
As of 2011 Indian Census, Gahmar had a total population of 25,994, of which 13,367 were males and 12,627 were females. Population within the age group of 0 to 6 years was 3,650. The total number of literates in Gahmar was 17,108, which constituted 65.8% of the population with male literacy of 74.0% and female literacy of 57.1%. The effective literacy rate of 7+ population of Gahmar was 76.6%, of which male literacy rate was 86.4% and female literacy rate was 66.2%. The Scheduled Castes and Scheduled Tribes population was 3,295 and 327 respectively. Gahmar had 4365 households in 2011. The main population of Gahmar lived in an area of 476 acres.

Transport

Railways
Gahmar has a railway station connected to Patna and Mughalsarai Junction railway station.

Roadways
Gahmar is situated on NH-124C which is connected to district headquarters Ghazipur, about 35 Km.

Places of interest
 Maa Kamakhya Temple, Gahmar
 Manbhadra Mahadev Temple, one of oldest temples of Shiva
 Narayan Ghat

Education
Gahmar has several educational organizations including government and private educational institutions. Gahmar has more than 15 private schools and more than 10 government schools including Primary schools. The oldest school called Middle school was established after 1st World War, which is still in operated. Gahmar Inter College and Govt girls Inter College Gahmar is the most popular government school while RSM Public school, Subhash Chandra Bose inter college and other schools  are top private schools. There is also  degree-granting college for higher education (graduate and post-graduate studies) named Ram Rahim Mahavidyalaya and Maa Kamakhya Mahavidyalaya which also have a study center of Uttar Pradesh Rajarshi Tandon Open University (UPRTOU, Prayagraj) and Veer Bahadur Singh Purvanchal University Jaunpur. A new Government Degree College is under construction which will completed soon.These affiliated colleges offer traditional undergraduate and postgraduate degrees in different subject.

References

Ghazipur
Villages in Ghazipur district
Railway stations in Ghazipur district